Tails Creek is a stream in the U.S. state of Georgia. It is a tributary to the Coosawattee River.

The stream was named for the "Tail" Indians which settled near its course. A variant name is "Tail Creek".

References

Rivers of Georgia (U.S. state)
Rivers of Gilmer County, Georgia